Sacred Heart Catholic Church is a historic Catholic church building in downtown Dayton, Ohio, United States.  Constructed at the end of the nineteenth century for a new parish, it closed in 1996, but was reopened in 2001 when a Vietnamese Catholic group began to use the church.  This church building remains significant because of its grand architectural elements, which have led to its designation as a historic site.

Parish history
One of Dayton's oldest Catholic parishes, St. Joseph's Church was established in 1846.  The lack of space in that church prompted some of the members to leave in July 1883 and establish Sacred Heart Church; under the leadership of St. Joseph's associate pastor Hugh McDevitt, the congregation rented a meeting hall while waiting for the construction of their building.  Land for the present church was purchased for $19,000, and William Henry Elder laid the cornerstone in June 1888.  Exterior work was completed in the following year, and by 1893 construction was close enough to completion that the congregation could begin worshipping in their building.  The building was consecrated by Bishop Maes of Covington in November 1895; construction had cost approximately $100,000 ($ in current dollar terms), but the parish was able to liquidate its debts by 1903.  For many years, the parish flourished, reaching a membership of five hundred families by 1909, but its membership had subsided by 1996.  Five years later, a Vietnamese-speaking Catholic parish began using the building.

Architecture
Designed by Charles Insco Williams, Sacred Heart is a limestone building with a limestone foundation, an asphalt roof, and various elements of sandstone and copper; the limestone was quarried locally, while the sandstone was obtained from Berea, Ohio.  Constructed in the Romanesque Revival style, but with a prominent octagonal Baroque dome and glazed cupola, towers flank the main entrance, and there are rose windows under the pediments of the front and side.  When constructed, the building featured a basement under the 75-foot ceiling, and its general plan was 115 by 92 feet, or 23, 35, and 28m respectively.  Grand woodworking, artwork, and chandeliers once filled the interior, but most have been removed; some were destroyed by the raging waters of the Great Flood of 1913, while others were intentionally removed or painted over at later dates.

Preservation
In October 1987, Sacred Heart Church was listed on the National Register of Historic Places.  Although as a religious property it would not normally be considered eligible for designation, it nevertheless qualified because of its distinctive historic architecture.  The parish's related rectory was also included in the designation.  It is one of five Dayton churches on the Register, along with St. Mary's, St. Adalbert's, and Holy Cross Catholic Churches and First Lutheran Church.

See also
 National Register of Historic Places listings in Dayton, Ohio

References

External links

Roman Catholic churches completed in 1890
Roman Catholic churches in Dayton, Ohio
Limestone churches in the United States
National Register of Historic Places in Montgomery County, Ohio
Romanesque Revival church buildings in Ohio
Stone churches in Ohio
19th-century Roman Catholic church buildings in the United States